Leaflets that are folded are usually used for advertising or marketing purposes, or for information supplementary to labels. There are many types of folds; only the most popular types are listed here. Although it is difficult to put a date on when some of these folds were first used, it is evident that their popularity boomed when the first mass production printers were introduced.

Parallel fold 

Different kinds of parallel folds are concertina folds, letter folds and gate folds.

Concertina fold 

A concertina fold, also known as a zig-zag fold, accordion fold or z-fold, is a continuous parallel folding of brochures and similar printed material in an accordion-like fashion, that is with folds alternatively made to the front and back in zig-zag folds. Because they do not nest (as in Letter Folds) panels can be the same size. Seen from above, concertina folds resemble a Z or M or series of zigs and zags.

In bookbinding a leporello binding has its pages concertina-folded, as above, but also has front and back boards so that it can be handled like a normal book. Sometimes there is a spine too, which provides a normal page-turning experience while eliminating the gutter of normal bookbinding. The origin of the word is based on the manservant in Mozart's Don Giovanni. At one point in the opera, Leporello unfolds a lengthy concertina list of his master's conquests.

Letter fold 

Folding pattern in which the folds are parallel and in the same direction, so that a kind of spiral is produced. The letter fold is a parallel fold. Two or more panels of the same width of the folded signature are folded around one panel. When the signature is folded twice, there are three panels on each side (six pages); with a tri-fold, the result is four panels on each side (eight pages). To allow proper nesting of panels that fold in, inside panels are usually  smaller than outer panels with the inside end panel being the smallest.

Also known as a spiral fold, trifold, brochure fold, business letter, C fold, roll fold and barrel fold.

Gate fold 

Also known as a window fold.

Double parallel fold 

In double parallel folds the paper is folded in half and then folded in half again with a fold parallel to the first fold. To allow for proper nesting the two inside folded panels are  smaller than the two outer panels.

Double gatefold 

In double gatefolds there are three parallel folds. The left and right edges of the paper fold and meet in the middle, without overlapping, along a center fold. The outer panels (the ones that fold in to the middle) are usually  smaller than the inner panels (the ones covered by the panels that fold in) to allow for proper folding and nesting.

French fold 
Takes a concertina fold, folded in half down the middle to create 8 individual sections. Also known as cross fold and quarter fold.

See also
Flyer (pamphlet)
Pamphlet
Brochure

References

Advertising publications by format